Iran Combine Manufacturing Company (ICM) is the largest combine manufacturer in the Middle East that is located in Arak. ICM was established in 1969 under license of American John Deere.

History
Iran combine Manufacturing Co. was established and registered in 1969 under the name of Jansaz (Ltd) and started production of agricultural machinery with a capacity of 20,000 tones per annum.

In 1970, the company was sold to a consortium led by American company John Deere, eventually changing its name to "Iran John Deere". However, in 1982, the company's ownership was changed to a joint stock share.

Operations
In 2008, Managing director of Iran Combine Manufacturing said that China had announced readiness to establish a joint venture in the company.

ICM products have been exported to China since 1984, and since then, the company's distribution network has expanded to include Kazakhstan, Tajikistan, Pakistan, Afghanistan, Iraq, Uzbekistan, Zimbabwe, Spain and Venezuela.

References

External links
Iran Combine Manufacturing Company

Iranian brands
Companies listed on the Tehran Stock Exchange

Companies based in Arak
Iranian companies established in 1969
Manufacturing companies of Iran
Agriculture companies of Iran
Iranian entities subject to the U.S. Department of the Treasury sanctions